Information flow can have one of several meanings:
 Information flow, in discourse-based grammatical theory
 Information Flow: The Logic of Distributed Systems an influential handbook by Jon Barwise and Jerry Seligman for the analysis of theories using its framework based on a melange of topics from information, model, and discourse theory which is applied to give a formalization of the logic of Quantum Mechanics.
 Information flow (information theory)
Information cascade in network theory
Information flow diagram
Communication
Knowledge sharing